Echinochloa pyramidalis is a species of large grass, occurring naturally in flooded regions and beside lakes in tropical Africa and America, and introduced to various other countries. It is commonly known as antelope grass.

Description
The stems are solid and roots grow from the lower nodes. The leaf sheaths can be either hairy or glabrous (hairless). This is a strong-growing plant with a fasciculated (arranged in bundles) root system and in suitable localities, forms dense stands of even height.

Distribution and habitat
Echinochloa pyramidalis is native to tropical and subtropical Africa. It is found throughout the continent in seasonally inundated grassland, swamps, river and lake edges. It grows well in black clay, and is moderately tolerant of anoxic conditions. It forms a substantial part of the vegetation in the Sudd, the vast swamp in South Sudan through which the White Nile passes. It has been introduced to other areas of the world as a fodder crop and has not in general become naturalised.

Uses
Echinochloa pyramidalis is palatable to livestock and is cultivated for fodder, being able to withstand heavy grazing; it grows during the wet season, dying back to the base during the dry season, but will resprout vigorously after wildfires, even in the middle of the dry season. It can be made into hay, but for this purpose the glabrous varieties are chosen. The grain is sometimes used for human consumption.

This grass can be used to prevent erosion on river banks prone to flooding and on earth dams. It can be used in a similar way to reeds for sewage control. Where it has become invasive, as for example in Mexico and Guyana, it reduces biodiversity and grows so vigorously that it displaces native plants.

References

pyramidalis